Drew is both a surname and a given name. A son of Charlemagne had that name, and it became popular in France as Dreus and Drues. Another source was the county of Dreux, also in France, ruled by the Counts of Dreux from the 12th century onward. The name was introduced to England by the Normans, in 1066 at the time of the Conquest, and is first found there in the Domesday Book. Another derivation is from the Irish Ó Draoi, literally meaning "Descendant of the Druid". As a male given name, it is a shortened version of Andrew.

The origin of the name is based from the old Greek andreios for brave or courageous.

First name

Male
Drew (artist) (born 1979), American artist of webcomic Toothpaste for Dinner
Noble Drew Ali (1886–1929), born Timothy Drew, founder of Moorish Science Temple of America
Drew Arnott, Scottish-Canadian musician and songwriter
Drew Binsky, American travel blogger
Drew Bledsoe (born 1972), American NFL quarterback
Drew Brees (born 1979), American NFL quarterback
Drew Butera (born 1983), American baseball player and coach
Drew Carey (born 1958), American actor, comedian, and game show host
Drew Carlton (born 1995), American baseball player
Drew Chadwick, musician on Season 2 of The X Factor
Drew Dalman (born 1998), American football player
Drew Dollar (born 2000), American NASCAR driver
Drew Doughty, LA Kings defenceman
Drew Ellis (disambiguation), several people
Drew Eubanks, American basketball player for the Portland Trail Blazers of the NBA
Drew Ferris (born 1992), American football player for the Tampa Bay Buccaneers of the National Football League
Drew Forbes (born 1997), American football player
Drew Fortier (born 1987), American musician, songwriter, filmmaker, actor, and author
Drew French (born 1984), American baseball coach
Drew Fuller (born 1983), American actor
Drew Goddard (born 1975), American film and television screenwriter, director, and producer
Drew Gooden (born 1981), Finnish-American sports broadcaster and former basketball player
Drew Gooden (comedian) (born 1993), American comedian and commentary YouTuber
Drew Gordon (born 1990), American basketball player
Drew Griffin (1962–2022), American broadcast journalist
Drew Gulak, American professional wrestler
Drew Hedman (born 1986), American baseball coach
Drew Houston (born 1983), American Internet entrepreneur, founder and CEO of Dropbox
Drew Hutchison (born 1990), American baseball player
Drew Jackson (born 1993), American baseball player
Drew Johnson (born 1979), American columnist, political commentator, investigative reporter and former think tank executive
Drew Lock (born 1996), American NFL quarterback
Drew Lynch (comedian), 2nd place America's Got Talent 2015
Drew Mahalic (born 1953), American football player
Drew McIntyre, Scottish professional wrestler
Drew Miller (disambiguation), several people
Drew Neemia, New Zealand television personality and singer
Drew Nixon, former member of Texas Senate
Drew Pavlou (born 1999), Australian activist and philosophy student, organiser of pro-democracy demonstrations in support of Hong Kong
Drew Peterson (born 1954), former American police sergeant, convicted felon
Drew Pinsky (born 1958), American physician and TV personality
Drew Plitt (born 1998), American football player
Drew Pomeranz (born 1988), American baseball player
Drew Rasmussen (born 1995), American baseball player
Drew Rosenhaus (born 1966), American sports agent
Drew Sample (born 1996), American football player
Drew Seeley (born 1982), Canadian-American actor, singer, and dancer
Drew Smith (disambiguation), several people
Drew Smyly (born 1989), American baseball player
Drew Stanton (born 1984), American NFL quarterback
Drew Starkey (born 1993), American actor
Drew Steckenrider (born 1991), American baseball player
Drew Struzan (born 1947), American illustrator and painter
Drew Stubbs (born 1984), American baseball player
Drew Taggart (born 1989), American songwriter and vocal of The Chainsmokers
Drew VerHagen (born 1990), American baseball player
Drew Waters (born 1998), American professional baseball player
Justin Drew Bieber (born 1994), Canadian singer-songwriter

Female
Drew Barrymore (born 1975), American actress
Drew Gilpin Faust (born 1947), American historian and 28th President of Harvard University
Drew Mechielsen (born 1997), Canadian BMX cyclist 
Drew Sidora (born 1985), American singer and actress

Surname
Alexander Drew (tennis), Briton who competed in the 1924 Wimbledon Championships – Men's Singles
Alvin Drew (born 1962), American astronaut
Ben Drew (disambiguation), several people
Bryce Drew (born 1974), American basketball player and coach; son of Homer Drew and brother of Scott Drew
Cameron Drew (born 1964), American baseball player
Charles R. Drew (1904–1950), American physician and medical researcher
Dan Drew (1878–1923), Irish hurler
Dan Drew (politician) (born 1979), American politician, mayor of Middletown, Connecticut 2011–2019
Daniel Drew (1797–1879), American businessman, steamship and railroad developer, and financier; one of the founders of Drew University
Daniel Drew (cricketer) (born 1996), Australian cricketer
Daniel Drew (rugby union) (1850–1914), Scottish rugby player
David Drew (politician) (born 1952), British politician
Dennis Drew (born 1957), American musician
Doug Drew (born 1920), player in the Canadian Football League for the Saskatchewan Roughriders
Ellen Drew (1915–2003), American actress
Fanny Drew, Canadian film producer
Frank Drew (1930-2021), US Air Force vice commander
George Alexander Drew (Liberal-Conservative MP) (1826–1891), Canadian politician (grandfather of George A. Drew)
George A. Drew (1894–1973), Canadian politician
George Franklin Drew (1827–1900), American politician
Georgiana Drew (1856–1893), American stage actress
Gerald A. Drew (1903–1970), American Foreign Service Officer
Harold Drew (born 1894), American college football coach
Homer Drew (born 1944), American college basketball coach; father of Bryce and Scott Drew
Howard Drew (1890–1957), American track and field athlete, original "World's Fastest Human", first black judge of Connecticut
Ira W. Drew (1878–1972), US Congressman from Pennsylvania
Irving W. Drew (1845–1922), American politician
 Captain J. Drew (Kent cricketer), 18th-century English amateur cricketer
J. D. Drew (born 1975), American baseball player
James Syme Drew (1883–1955), Major-General in the British Army during World War II
Jane Drew (1911–1996), English architect
Jeff Van Drew (born 1953), American politician
John Drew Sr. (1827–1862), Irish-American stage actor
John Drew Jr. (1853–1927), American actor
John Drew (basketball) (born 1954), American basketball player
Jordan Drew (born 1995), Australian Rugby League player
Joseph Drew (1814–1883), English newspaper editor
Kara Drew (born 1975), American wrestler best known under the ring name Cherry
Kenny Drew (1928–1993), American musician
Kenny Drew Jr. (born 1958), American jazz pianist
Kevin Drew (born 1976), Canadian musician
Larry Drew (born 1958), American basketball player
Larry Drew II (born 1990), American basketball player
Linzi Drew (born 1959), English glamour model
 Lori Drew, defendant in United States v. Lori Drew
Louisa Lane Drew (1820–1897), British-American actress and theatre owner
Malaya Drew (born 1978), American actress
Maurice Jones-Drew (born 1985), American footballer
Michael Drew, chemistry professor at the University of Reading
Pamela Drew (1910–1989), British artist 
Paula Drew (born 1925/1926), American former actress, singer, and commercial spokesperson
R. Harmon Drew Sr. (1917–1995), American judge and politician
Richard Drew (photographer) (born 1946), American photojournalist
Richard Gurley Drew (1899–1980), American inventor
Richard Maxwell Drew (1822–1850), American politician
Robert Drew (1924–2014), American documentary filmmaker
Robert Drew (politician) (1575–1645), English politician
Ronnie Drew (1934–2008), Irish folk singer and musician
Ronnie Le Drew, Canadian puppeteer
Samuel Drew (1765–1833), English Methodist theologian
Samuel J. Drew (1863–1926), American politician
Sarah Drew (born 1980), American actress
Scott Drew (born 1970), American college basketball coach; brother of Bryce Drew and son of Homer Drew
Stephen Drew (born 1983), American Major League Baseball player
Thomas Stevenson Drew (1802–1879), American politician
Noble Drew Ali, real name Timothy Drew (1886–1929), American founder of the Moorish Science Temple of America

Fictional characters
Drew Torres, in Degrassi
Spider-Woman (Jessica Drew), superhero in the Marvel Comics Universe
Nancy Drew, teen sleuth
Dr. Drakken, real name Drew Lipsky
 Drew Pickles, in the cartoon Rugrats
Drew (Pokémon), in the Pokémon anime series
 Drew Saturday, mother of Zak Saturday in The Secret Saturdays
Drew Kirk, from TV soap opera Neighbours
 Drew Tanaka, in the Percy Jackson & the Olympians book series
Alexander Drew, in True Blood
Sydney Drew, in the Power Rangers S.P.D. TV series

References

See also
Drewe, a surname
Drews, a surname
Dru (disambiguation), includes a list of people with given name and surname Dru
Drue, a given name and surname
Alexander Drew (company), taken over by Coloroll
Jrue Holiday (born 1990), American basketball player

Hypocorisms
Masculine given names
Feminine given names
Unisex given names
English masculine given names
English feminine given names
English unisex given names
English-language surnames